Hofamt Priel is a municipality  in the district of Melk in the Austrian state of Lower Austria north of the river Danube.

Population

References

Cities and towns in Melk District